Gano is a name.

People with the surname

 Eugene Gano Hay (1853–1933), US political figure
 Francis Gano Benedict (1870–1957), US chemist and nutritionist
 Gordon Gano (born 1963), US musician
 Graham Gano (born 1987), US athlete in American football
 John Gano (1727–1804), US pastor
 Richard Montgomery Gano (1830–1913), US Protestant minister and physician, Confederate Army officer
 Roy Alexander Gano (1902–1971), US Navy admiral
 Stephen Gano (1762–1828), US pastor and physician
 Zinho Gano (born 1993), Belgian athlete in football

People with the given name
 Gano Chittenden (1897–1980), US art director
 Gano Dunn (1870–1953), US business and technology figure
 Gano Grills (fl. 1990s – present), US film actor

Locations
 Gano Coal Camp, Kentucky, an unincorporated community in Harlan County, Kentucky, USA
 Gano, Kansas, an unincorporated community in Finney County, Kansas, USA
 Gano, Ohio, an unincorporated community in Butler County, Ohio, USA

Other
 Gano Forum, a political party in Bangladesh